Midnight Episode is a 1950 British thriller mystery film directed by Gordon Parry.
It is based on the novel Monsieur La Souris written by Georges Simenon in the year 1938, and adapted for screen by Rita Barisse. It featured Stanley Holloway, Leslie Dwyer, Reginald Tate and Meredith Edwards in the lead roles.

The film was released in United States on 19 May 1955.

Plot
An indigent street performer of Shakesperian verse chances upon a wallet filled with money and private papers.
For its loser's desperate acquaintances, the papers have more value than any finder could conceive. A value for them its retrieval makes imperative, and, for the seemingly- fortunate finder, its longed-for riches only involve him in their violent world, and in more trouble than he ever knew, as a poorer man.

Cast
 Stanley Holloway as Professor Prince
 Leslie Dwyer as Albert
 Reginald Tate as Inspector Lucas
 Meredith Edwards as Detective Sergeant Taylor
 Wilfrid Hyde-White as Mr. Knight
 Joy Shelton as Mrs. Arnold
 Raymond Young as Miller 
 Leslie Perrins as Charles Mason
 Sebastian Cabot as Benno
 Campbell Copelin as The General
 Natasha Parry as Jill harris

Reviews

The film received positive reviews.

References

External links
 

1950s mystery thriller films
Films based on Belgian novels
Films based on works by Georges Simenon
Films directed by Gordon Parry
British black-and-white films
British mystery thriller films
British remakes of French films
Films set in London
1950s English-language films
1950s British films